Thomas de Lynton (fl. 1380s) was a Canon of Windsor from 1378 to 1387 and Dean of the Chapel Royal.

Career
He was appointed:
Prebendary of Newington in St Paul's Cathedral 1381
Treasurer of Wells Cathedral 1383
Prebendary of Colworth in Chichester Cathedral 1385 - 1388

He was appointed to the fourth stall in St George's Chapel, Windsor Castle in 1378, and held the stall until 1387.

Notes 

Canons of Windsor
Deans of the Chapel Royal